Thuli–Makwe Dam is a reservoir on the Thuli River, west of Gwanda, Zimbabwe with a capacity of 8.3 million cubic metres.

References

Thuli River
Dams in Zimbabwe
Shashe River
Gwanda District
Buildings and structures in Matabeleland South Province